María Fernanda Astudillo Barrezueta is an Ecuadorian politician. She was elected to the National Assembly in 2021.

Life
Astudillo was elected to the National Assembly in 2021. She is the representative of El Oro Province and a member of the Union for Hope coalition.

In November 2021 she was one of the 81 politicians who abstained which allowed the Economic Development and Fiscal Sustainability Law to be passed. Other abstainers included Paola Cabezas, Jessica Castillo, Soledad Diab, Ana Herrera, Gissella Molina and Patricia Sánchez.

She has been accused of encouraging payments to Asotex Orense. The accusation was made by Eitel Zambrano of the National Agreement Bank BAN. The case was investigated by the National Assembly's Ethics Committee. Astudillo was the third member to appear in front on the committee. Bella Jimenez had lost her seat within months of gaining it.

The National Assembly's Ethics Committee's report about Astudillo was scheduled to be presented at the assembly on May 17, but the session was suspended by Guadalupe Llori. Astudillo was a member of the Commission on Constitutional Guarantees, Human Rights, Collective Rights and Interculturality in June 2022 with Guadalupe Llori, Sofia Sanchez, Joseph Cabascango and Victoria Desintonio.

References 

Living people
Members of the National Assembly (Ecuador)
Women members of the National Assembly (Ecuador)
21st-century Ecuadorian politicians
21st-century Ecuadorian women politicians
Year of birth missing (living people)